Butler is a village in Richland County in the U.S. state of Ohio. It is part of the Mansfield, Ohio Metropolitan Statistical Area. The population was 933 at the 2010 census.

Early history

Before Butler was founded and named, it was the site of the Delaware Indians hunting ground. Helltown, as the Indians called it, was chosen for its plentiful wild game and fertile farmlands. As early as 1808, settlers were living in Northeastern Worthington township, however the area that makes up Butler was not settled until another 10 years.
Joseph Craig was the first white man to settle in the Butler area. James Monroe, the fifth president of the United States, had given Craig a land grant in 1823. Samuel Lewis, another interesting man, traveled through the area in 1809. On January 7, 1813, Lewis organized and divided Richland area into townships. Butler became Worthington township.
Independence was laid out on the northwest quarter of Section 20, January 12, 1848, by Daniel Spohn. In the early days of its existence it was nicknamed "Spohntown " and " Squeelgut," but was named Independence by Thomas B. Andrews, rather in a spirit of defiance at the attitude of Bellville, which was not a friendly one to the aspiring village. The name was changed to Butler in the 1870s, after a Mexican war hero, General William Butler. In 1891 the name Independence was changed to Butler to match the post office. Andrews was born in 1807 and arrived in the village on November 15, 1833. Later Daniel Spohn and Andrews had the town laid out. Spohn was born in 1781 and died January 18, 1865, 13 years after the town was founded on January 12, 1848. Andrews was its first Postmaster, and, before the town was laid out, kept the office in his house near the site. After the town was laid out and a warehouse erected, he moved the office into the warehouse. The land upon which the town stands was entered on May 13, 1820 by William Simmons. The town plat was surveyed by Joseph Hastings. Mr. Andrews was instrumental in getting the town established and laying it out, taking a plot of land for pay.

The first store was started by William Lamley, who kept groceries and whisky. It may be remarked here that Independence is a temperance town, and will not allow (since the Bowersox affair mentioned in another chapter) any saloon to exist in the place. Lamley's store was a small frame building, near the railroad, in the north end of the town. He afterward erected a building, which is now occupied by Downing as a store, and started a hotel. Joseph Geary kept this hotel, the first in the place. David Teeter erected a second hotel. John Diltz, a carpenter and present Postmaster, erected the next dwelling, and shortly after, Daniel Garber erected a shoe-shop on Main Street. William Clapper erected the next building and kept boarders.

Gen. G. A. Jones came up from Mount Vernon, erected a warehouse, started a store and dealt in produce. In 1856, I. W. Pearce purchased the warehouse of Jones, conducted the business, and was also railroad agent. This gentleman at present keeps the principal store in the place, and does what banking business is necessary.
The Bowersox Saloon was the site of an infamous murder that occurred in 1878 when the keeper of the saloon, Samuel P. Bowersox shot a man outside of his bar. After closing hours, Bowersox became angry by some young men that had been lingering causing disturbance. Bowersox fired a gun into the crowd, killing Alfred N. Palm. Enraged citizens burned down the Bowersox Saloon that night. Bowersox was tried and acquitted, rumor had it that his liquor suppliers in Mansfield bribed the judge to keep the bar open.

When the town was out, the schoolhouse A-frame was a short distance south of town.

In 1868, the present building was erected. It is a two-story frame, and occupied by two teachers and about one hundred pupils.
The B&O railroad played a big part in the town's development. The railroad was built in 1853 and it was the only railroad in the United States noted to enter and leave the town from the same direction (west). In 1872, there was two passenger trains that collided killing eight people and injuring 40 more.

In 1877, the village was incorporated, the first Mayor being J. M. McLaughlin; the second and present Mayor, George W. McBee.

There are four dry-goods and grocery stores, one hardware, one stove and tin, and several smaller establishments; two churches, one hotel, and a proper proportion of mechanics and professional men. The population is about four hundred. The place stands in a great land in the Baltimore & Ohio Railroad. - From "The History of Richland County" by A. A. Graham 1880.

Geography
Butler is located at  (40.588906, -82.425627), along the Clear Fork of the Mohican River.

Demographics

2010 census
As of the census of 2010, there were 933 people, 362 households, and 259 families residing in the village. The racial makeup of the village was 98.3% White, 0.4% African American, 0.1% Native American, 0.1% Asian, 0.3% from other races, and 0.8% from two or more races. Hispanic or Latino of any race were 1.5% of the population.

There were 362 households, of which 36.5% had children under the age of 18 living with them, 53.3% were married couples living together, 13.0% had a female householder with no husband present, 5.2% had a male householder with no wife present, and 28.5% were non-families. 24.9% of all households were made up of individuals, and 10% had someone living alone who was 65 years of age or older. The average household size was 2.57 and the average family size was 3.05.

The median age in the village was 37.2 years. 26.8% of residents were under the age of 18; 8.7% were between the ages of 18 and 24; 24.6% were from 25 to 44; 24.9% were from 45 to 64; and 15% were 65 years of age or older. The gender makeup of the village was 48.3% male and 51.7% female.

2000 census
As of the census of 2000, there were 921 people, 359 households, and 268 families residing in the village. The population density was 856.5 people per square mile (329.3/km2). There were 386 housing units at an average density of 359.0 per square mile (138.0/km2). The racial makeup of the village was 99.46% White, 0.11% African American, 0.11% Asian, and 0.33% from two or more races. Hispanic or Latino of any race were 0.65% of the population.

There were 359 households, out of which 35.4% had children under the age of 18 living with them, 58.8% were married couples living together, 10.6% had a female householder with no husband present, and 25.3% were non-families. 22.6% of all households were made up of individuals, and 8.9% had someone living alone who was 65 years of age or older. The average household size was 2.57 and the average family size was 2.99.

In the village, the population was spread out, with 26.5% under the age of 18, 8.7% from 18 to 24, 27.9% from 25 to 44, 24.2% from 45 to 64, and 12.7% who were 65 years of age or older. The median age was 36 years. For every 100 females there were 102.4 males. For every 100 females age 18 and over, there were 102.1 males.

The median income for a household in the village was $39,886, and the median income for a family was $45,179. Males had a median income of $37,417 versus $20,750 for females. The per capita income for the village was $18,380. About 2.6% of families and 4.9% of the population were below the poverty line, including 5.5% of those under age 18 and 4.9% of those age 65 or over.

Education
Butler is located within the Clear Fork Valley Local School District. Schools in the district that are located in Butler are Butler Elementary School. Clear Fork Middle School and Clear Fork High School are located just outside Bellville.

Butler has a public library, a branch of the Mansfield–Richland County Public Library.

Notable person

 Jim Wilson, banker and City Council member, born in Butler

References

Further reading
Pictorial History of Butler, Ohio. "The History of Butler: Tales of a Little Town". Butler Clear Fork Valley Historical Society. 1997.

Villages in Richland County, Ohio
Villages in Ohio